MV Iron Baron (formerly MV Ocean Express and MV Irrawaddy) was a 37,557 dwt bulk carrier built in 1985. It was chartered by BHP Shipping in 1990.

On 10 July 1995 it was nearing the end of a voyage transporting 24,000 tonnes of manganese ore from Groote Eylandt via Port Kembla to the port of Launceston in northern Tasmania, Australia.  Weather conditions at the time were north-westerly 37–46 km/h (20–25 knot) winds and two-metre seas. It grounded on Hebe Reef as it approached the mouth of the Tamar River and began leaking bunker fuel oil.  The crew was safely evacuated.

Salvage work commenced and the first casualties of the incident, a dead penguin and three dead cormorants, were recovered by 13 July. At that time 200 penguins had been taken into care.

On 16 July the Iron Baron was refloated and moved to an offshore anchorage. Underwater inspections confirmed that it had incurred major structural damage and was continuing to deteriorate. With further bad weather predicted, it was decided by BHP to dump the ship.

Environmental impact
An estimated 325 tonnes of heavy bunker fuel oil was spilled from the vessel in the course of its grounding, refloating and towing to the disposal ground.

Several beaches and islands in north-eastern Tasmania were affected and a major clean-up and wildlife rescue effort was undertaken. Little penguins were especially badly affected with 1894 oiled birds collected for treatment and rehabilitation. An estimated 2000–6000 were killed at Ninth Island alone. In 2001, penguin fatalities were estimated at between 10,000 and 20,000 birds. In 2005, a 10-year post-mortem reflection on the incident revised the figure upwards, estimating penguin fatalities at 25,000.

References

External links
 Department of the Environment, Parks, Heritage and Arts, Tasmania: Iron Baron Oil Spill Environmental Impacts Report – Executive Summary

Bulk carriers
Shipwrecks of Tasmania
North East Tasmania
Maritime incidents in 1995
1984 ships
Ships of BHP Shipping
Scuttled vessels
Oil spills in Australia